Georgette Heyer (1902–1974) was an English author particularly known for her historical romance novels set in the Regency and Georgian eras. A best-selling author, Heyer's writing career saw her produce works from a variety of genres; in total she published 32 novels in the romance genre, 6 historical novels, 4 contemporary novels, and 12 in the detective fiction genre.

Born in Wimbledon, London, the nineteen-year-old Heyer published her first novel, The Black Moth, in 1921 from a story she had written for her hemophiliac younger brother Boris. The Georgian novel, which featured an earl who turns to outlawry in the 18th century, set the template for many of her future stories – romance, a historical setting, characters from the nobility, and a "saturnine" male lead. The Black Moth was popular with readers and Heyer continued to publish more Georgian novels until the release of Faro's Daughter in 1941.

Heyer's fame stemmed mainly from her Regency novels, which made her a household name. The first, Regency Buck, became a best-seller when it was published in 1935, and featured a wealthy heiress from the English countryside, whose sense of independence causes her to clash with London's social norms, but eventually conform to them – qualities seen in many other Heyer heroines. Gradually, Heyer developed a "distinct, light-hearted" style, and her 1940 Regency novel The Corinthian established elements common in her future works: clever plotting, light comedic elements, and a writing style reminiscent of the Regency era. After 1940 her output consisted mainly of Regency novels, a collection of works that totaled 26 by the time of her death in 1974.

Heyer was noted for the thorough historical detail she invested in her works – unlike her literary predecessors, who typically lived in the eras they wrote about, Heyer had to enliven the past for her contemporary readers; she thus endeavored to research every available aspect of her chosen plot settings. Despite the popularity of her romance novels, Heyer did not consider herself a romance writer and had ambivalent feelings towards the genre, once dismissing her stories as "another bleeding romance." Heyer published historical novels such as The Conqueror (1931), which depicted the early years of William I. The careful detail found in her 1937 historical romance, An Infamous Army, attracted critical acclaim. Her other novels never reached this level of positive critical opinion and have been largely overlooked by scholars. Heyer aspired for many years to produce "the magnum opus of my latter years," a medieval trilogy featuring the House of Lancaster. This project failed to come to full fruition, as she faced pressure from eager readers to continue publishing her popular romance novels; the tax liabilities she dealt with were also a factor. Heyer's only installment of the Lancaster trilogy, My Lord John (1975), went unfinished and was published a year after her death.

Early in her career, Heyer experimented with other literary genres, resulting in the release of four serious contemporary novels between 1922 and 1930, all of which enjoyed multiple reprints though were not as successful as her historical novels of the time, and were later suppressed by the author. With the help of her husband George Ronald Rougier, who devised the murder method in most of her detective novels, Heyer also delved into works of contemporary detective fiction such as Footsteps in the Dark (1932) and They Found Him Dead (1937). In total she published 12 in the genre between 1932 and 1953, when her final detective novel Detection Unlimited appeared.

Heyer's romance novels sold in huge numbers (one million a year in paperback in the 1970s) and had been translated into more than 10 languages by the time of her death. She is mostly remembered for these works, rather than for her efforts in other literary genres. Heyer has been credited with "virtually invent[ing]" the Regency romance novel and its "comedy of manners," a literary form in turn influenced by Jane Austen. Heyer described herself as "a mixture of [Samuel] Johnson and Austen," and according to the scholar Mary Joannou, Austen's influence on Heyer is clear: both wrote of the Regency era and focused on marriage to drive the plot. Pamela Regis cites Heyer's influence in every historical romance novel published since 1921, and Elizabeth Spillman adds that because Heyer wrote romances for five decades, "her writing career spans the emerging of the romance as a publishing category and she was influential in shaping that genre." Widely read today, most of Heyer's works are still in print and adaptations have been made on film, television, stage, and radio.

Georgian novels

Regency novels

Other historical novels

Contemporary novels

Detective novels

Essays

Short stories

References

Works cited

 
 

 
 
 
 
 
 
 
 
 
 
 
 
 

Bibliographies of British writers
 
Romantic fiction bibliographies